The yellow-bellied climbing mouse (Rhipidomys ochrogaster) is a species of arboreal rodent in the family Cricetidae. It is known only from southeastern Peru, where it has been found in cloud forest at an elevation of 1830 m. This species was long known only by the type collection until it was rediscovered in May 2010.

References

Musser, G. G. and M. D. Carleton. 2005. Superfamily Muroidea. pp. 894–1531 in Mammal Species of the World a Taxonomic and Geographic Reference. D. E. Wilson and D. M. Reeder eds. Johns Hopkins University Press, Baltimore.

Rhipidomys
Mammals of Peru
Mammals described in 1901
Taxonomy articles created by Polbot